Julien Grujon (7 May 1904 – 16 October 1976) was a French racing cyclist. He rode in the 1928 Tour de France.

References

1904 births
1976 deaths
French male cyclists
Place of birth missing